Charles Boyd, MA (19 February 1842 – 3 May 1914) was  Archdeacon of Colombo from 1891 until  1901.

He was educated at Rugby and University College, Oxford. After a curacy in Newbury he was Rector of Princes Risborough from  1877 to 1879. He was Chaplain  of St. Peter's Church, Colombo and to the British Armed Forces there from 1879 until his appointment as Archdeacon.

References

Sri Lankan Anglican priests
Anglican chaplains
People educated at Rugby School
Alumni of University College, Oxford
1842 births
1914 deaths
Archdeacons of Colombo